is a Japanese track and field athlete. She competed in the women's long jump at the 1976 Summer Olympics.

References

1952 births
Living people
Place of birth missing (living people)
Japanese female long jumpers
Olympic female long jumpers
Olympic athletes of Japan
Athletes (track and field) at the 1976 Summer Olympics
Asian Games bronze medalists for Japan
Asian Games medalists in athletics (track and field)
Athletes (track and field) at the 1978 Asian Games
Medalists at the 1978 Asian Games
Japan Championships in Athletics winners
20th-century Japanese women